KMZK (106.9 FM) is a commercial alternative rock formatted broadcast radio station licensed to Clifton, Colorado, serving the Grand Junction, CO Metropolitan Statistical Area, Northwestern Colorado and Northeastern Utah. KMZK is owned and operated by LD Grant, JD Northcutt and KD Harris, through licensee Get Smashed Radio Broadcasting Network, LLC. This station's transmitter is on Baxter Pass, while its studios are located in Downtown Fruita, CO.

On May 10, 2021, KMZK rebranded as "106.9 Radio Z".

KMZK's transmitter and antenna were damaged by lightning in December 2021. The station went on a back up transmitter at a very reduced signal. In May 2022, KMZK's back up transmitter suffered from a power surge and failed. Get Smashed Radio filed for Special Temporary Authority (STA) from the FCC, which was approved.

Currently, a small temporary 3 kW transmitter has been placed at the tower site at Baxter Pass, however KMZK is in the process of relocating to a new tower location on Black Ridge. New equipment has been delivered and is scheduled to be installed within the next 6 weeks. This new location will allow KMZK to lower its overall signal output and allow better coverage for the Grand Junction MSA.

Radio Z continues to stream 24/7 via its website Radio Z Online; mobile apps: Google, Amazon, or iTunes; or via Live365; and TuneIn.

Programming 
KMZK 106.9 Radio Z plays a variety of Alternative, Modern, Punk, and some 80's rock. They have a big focus on local Colorado music and provides airtime to local bands who sign up through their website. On weekdays, 106.9 Radio Z has 2 daypart shows: Kain Mornings from 6am – 10am(MT); and Afternoons with LD from 2pm – 7pm(MT). On weekends, 106.9 Radio Z features syndicated radio show LA Lloyd's Rock 30 Countdown which runs Saturday morning from 7am – 10am(MT); and has local show Retro Radio hosted by LD Rizzo which runs from 10pm-2am(MT) on Saturday nights. On Sunday mornings, 106.9 Radio Z offers issues programming for the community which airs at 5:30am – 6am(MT).

Previous logo

References

External links 
106.9 Radio Z Online

2011 establishments in Colorado
Alternative rock radio stations in the United States
Radio stations established in 2011
MZK